Cystidicolidae is a family of spirurian nematodes. It was created by Skrjabin in 1946. All members of the family are parasites of fish.

Systematics
According to the World Register of Marine Species, the family Cystidicolidae includes the following genera:

 Ascarophis Van Beneden, 1871 
 Ascarophisnema Moravec & Justine, 2010 
 Caballeronema Margolis, 1977 
 Capillospirura Skrjabin, 1924
 Collarinema Sey, 1970 
 Comephoronema Layman, 1933 
 Cristitectus Petter, 1970 
 Ctenascarophis Mamaev, 1968 
 Cystidicola Fisher, 1798
 Cystidicoloides Skinker, 1931 
 Metabronema Yorke & Maplestone, 1926
 Metabronemoides Moravec & Justine, 2010 
 Moravecnema Justine, Cassone & Petter, 2002 
 Neoascarophis Machida, 1976 
 Parascarophis Campana-Rouget, 1955  
 Prospinitectus Petter, 1979 
 Pseudascarophis Ko, Margolis & Machida, 1985 
 Pseudoproleptus Khera, 1953
 Salmonema Moravec, Santos & Brasil-Sato, 2008 
 Salvelinema Trofimenko, 1962
 Spinitectoides Petter, 1969 
 Spinitectus Fourment, 1883

References

 
Spirurida
Nematode families